The Ranfurly Shield, colloquially known as the Log o' Wood, is perhaps the most prestigious trophy in New Zealand's domestic rugby union competition. First played for in 1904, the Ranfurly Shield is based on a challenge system, rather than a league or knockout competition as with most football trophies. The holding union defends the Shield in challenge matches - which are their home games - and if a challenger defeats them, they become the new holder of the Shield.

Hawke's Bay had held the Shield since 4 October 2020 and successfully defended it 14 times, making it the province's third longest Ranfurly Shield reign.

Wellington's first and only defence of the Shield in 2022 was against  on 24 September 2022, which resulted in a 34–6 win to the new holders.

Holders

Last updated: after Wellington successfully defended the Shield on 24 September 2022.

Fixtures

2020
Source:

2021
Source:

2022
Source:

Top points and try scorers

Points scorers 
The following are the top five points scorers for all Ranfurly Shield matches between 2020 and 2029.

Last updated: after Wellington successfully defended the Shield on 24 September 2022.

Try scorers 
The following are the top ten try scorers for all Ranfurly Shield matches between 2020 and 2029.

Last updated: after Wellington successfully defended the Shield on 24 September 2022.

See also

Rugby union in New Zealand
Hanan Shield
National Provincial Championship

References

External links
Ranfurly Shield history on the Provincial Rugby website

Ranfurly Shield
Rugby union trophies and awards
New Zealand rugby union competitions
New Zealand sports trophies and awards
2020 in New Zealand rugby union
2021 in New Zealand rugby union